Nigel Cox may refer to:
 Nigel Cox (author) (1951–2006), New Zealand author and museum director
 Nigel Cox (doctor) (born 1945), British consultant rheumatologist and the only doctor ever to have been convicted in Britain for attempted euthanasia
 Nigel Cox (artist) (born 1959), Irish figurative artist